Šećerana may refer to:

 Šećerana, Beli Manastir, a settlement in Beli Manastir municipality, Croatia
 Šećerana, Zrenjanin, a neighborhood in Zrenjanin, Serbia